Édgar Israel Ruiz Burgos (born 11 February 1973) is a Mexican former professional boxer who competed from 1992 to 2011. As an amateur, he competed in the men's light welterweight event at the 1992 Summer Olympics. He made his amateur debut at the age of 14.

References

External links
 
 

1973 births
Living people
Mexican male boxers
Olympic boxers of Mexico
Boxers at the 1992 Summer Olympics
Boxers at the 1991 Pan American Games
Pan American Games silver medalists for Mexico
Pan American Games medalists in boxing
Boxers from Sinaloa
Sportspeople from Los Mochis
Light-welterweight boxers
Medalists at the 1991 Pan American Games